DISCOVERY Children's Museum is a nonprofit children’s museum in Las Vegas, Nevada, dedicated to providing children of all abilities, backgrounds, and beliefs, access to fun and exciting STEAM (science, technology, engineering, art, and math) educational experiences. Formerly known as Lied Discovery Children's museum, this , three-story space for learning and play is now located adjacent to The Smith Center in Downtown Las Vegas. The Museum sees roughly 250,000 visitors each year.

The mission of DISCOVERY Children’s Museum is to foster a welcoming, vibrant, and inclusive environment where all are invited to engage in playful and educational experiences that ignite a lifelong love of learning.

History 
The LIED Discovery Children’s Museum was founded by Robin Greenspun and Mark Tratos in 1984. The pair arranged a partnership between the Junior League of Las Vegas and the Allied Arts Council to fund a much-needed nonprofit educational institution in the Las Vegas Valley. In 1985, a bond issued to authorize the building of the Las Vegas-Clark County Library and Lied Discovery Children’s Museum, which opened its doors on September 9, 1990.

Relocation 
In 2010 the museum announced plans to construct and occupy a new home and larger home in Symphony Park. The total for the Donald W. Reynolds Discovery Center project was $50 million. In August 2010, the Donald W. Reynolds Foundation announced a gift to The Smith Center to pay for the completion of its block in Symphony Park. $43 million of that gift was used to build the Donald W. Reynolds Discovery Center. The museum raised the remaining $7 million needed to complete the project. The new museum opened on March 9, 2013.

Exhibits 
The Summit: A three story, adventure-filled tower with interactive science exhibits on every floor, along with climbing and sliding structures that make it a physically challenging and mentally stimulating.

DISCOVERY Lab: It doesn’t get more hands-on than this. The Discovery Lab is an innovative maker space where kids can get creative, imagine, build, take risks, and feel free to make mistakes and learn from them.

Patents Pending: Budding engineers will love this lab-like environment that’s all about using experimentation, invention, problem solving and tinkering to solve design and engineering challenges.

Toddler Town: A unique, hands-on learning environment designed especially for the endlessly curious, imaginative and always-learning under-5 set.

Water World: Water is precious and powerful. Here kids might get a little wet, but it’s all in the process of learning all about the wonder of water.

Fantasy Festival: A feast for every child’s imagination, Fantasy Festival features stage sets, costumes and interactive displays that will have the kids entertaining you for a change.

Young At Art: This is a whimsical, wonderful environment where naturally-artistic kids can explore the “language” of art and spark their creativity at different “creative stations” featuring a variety of artistic mediums.

Eco City: This exhibit is all business. Kids can participate in different jobs in an environmentally-friendly city, featuring interactive businesses including a hospital, store, café, airport, auto shop and the new Raiders stadium.

Solve It!: This immersive exhibit is all about investigation. Visitors are tasked with solving a challenging mystery by gathering data in different environments, all while learning the scientific problem-solving skills used in investigations.

Outreach Programs 
DISCOVERY on Wheels: Developed 2009, DISCOVERY Children’s Museum’s DISCOVERY on Wheels program brings hands-on, interactive health science programs directly to the classroom. Trained educators offer specific lesson plans that follow national, state, and local curriculum standards. The curriculum targets Kindergarten - 5th grade elementary school students in Clark County, public, charter, and private schools. A professional Museum educator facilitates the program along with everything needed for the learning experience. Each program can accommodate approximately 30 participants, up to six programs a day at the same school.

Museums for All: Museums for All is an admission subsidies program that offers a greatly-reduced admission price of just $3.00 to anyone on food assistance (i.e. in possession of a valid SNAP, WIC, or EBT card) as well as to foster families.

YouthWorks: Established in 1994, the Museum’s YouthWorks Internship program is designed for high school students ages 15-17 years old. This program affords teens a chance to gain educational enrichment, learn new skills, and start an employment portfolio while developing personal and professional growth experiences.

References

External links 

Children's museums in Nevada
Museums in Las Vegas
Downtown Las Vegas
Symphony Park
Museums established in 1984
1984 establishments in Nevada